Fritz Ascher (17 October 1893 in Berlin, Germany – 26 March 1970 in Berlin, Germany) was a German artist, whose work is characterized by Expressionist and Symbolist sensitivity. In paintings, works on paper and poetry he explored existential questions and themes of contemporary social and cultural relevance, of spirituality and mythology. Ascher's expressive strokes and intense colors create emotionally intense and authentic work.

Early life and work 
Fritz Ascher was born in Berlin, on 17 October 1893, the son of the dental surgeon and businessman Dr. Hugo Ascher (born Neugard 27 July 1859 – died 18 August 1922 Berlin) and Minna Luise Ascher (born Schneider; Berlin, 17 January 1867 – died 17 October 1938). His sisters Charlotte Hedwig and Margarete Lilly (Grete) were born 8 October 1894 and 11 June 1897. Hugo Ascher converted his three children to Protestantism in 1901, his wife remained Jewish. Hugo Ascher's business was successful, and in 1909 the family moved into a villa in Niklasstraße 21–23 in Berlin-Zehlendorf, built by the prominent architect Professor Paul Schultze-Naumburg.

At the age of 16 he studied with Max Liebermann, who gave him the "Künstlereinjährige," an art diploma, and recommended him to the art academy Königsberg. There, dean Ludwig Dettmann, co-founder of the Berlin Secession, had hired dynamic teachers who emphasized the value of a solid, practical education. Among others, the artist befriended Eduard Bischoff, who painted a portrait of him in 1912.

Back in Berlin around 1913, Ascher studied in the painting schools of Lovis Corinth, Adolf Meyer and Curt Agthe. He was active in the networks of the Berlin avant-garde, and knew many artists personally. Influenced by Expressionist artists such as the older Edvard Munch, Emil Nolde and Wassily Kandinsky, and his contemporaries Max Beckmann, Georges Rouault and Ludwig Meidner, Ascher found his very own artistic language. He traveled extensively and started exhibiting his work. In 1914, Ascher and his friend and fellow painter Franz Domscheit (Pranas Domšaitis) presumably traveled to Norway and met Edvard Munch in Oslo. During a longer stay in Bavaria and Munich in 1919 Domscheit (Pranas Domšaitis) drew into Aschers sketchbook and Ascher drew a portrait of his friend. Ascher met the artists of the Blue Rider and befriended the artists of the satirical German weekly magazine Simplicissimus, among them Gustav Meyrink, Alfred Kubin, George Grosz and Käthe Kollwitz.

Ascher's expressive strokes and intense colors with descriptive outlines and areal color combine elements of Expressionism with those of Symbolism. His early work is very multifaceted in themes, the techniques used and the style of painting. The result is a fascinating field of tension between small intimate graphite drawings and large-format polychrome figural compositions, between portraits and biblical scenes, character and milieu studies or between representations of literary and allegorical figures. At the same time, he responded to contemporary themes, such as the street fights of the November Revolution of 1918.

The artist now created some of his most important work, among them "Lone Man" ("Der Vereinsamte") from c. 1914, his very new interpretation of the crucifixion, "Golgotha" (1915), the Jewish myth "Golem" (1916), his "Bajazzo and Artists" ("Bajazzo und Artisten") from 1916/1945, and his powerful portrait of the composer Ludwig van Beethoven (1924/1945).

1933–1945 

On 30 January 1933 Hitler assumed power. As Modern painter and Jewish-born, Ascher could no longer produce, exhibit, or sell his art. He hid among friends in Berlin and Potsdam, constantly changing his residence. During the Pogroms on 9–10 November 1938, Ascher was arrested and interned in the Sachsenhausen concentration camp and the Potsdam Gestapo prison. Released six months later, he survived the Nazi terror regime hiding in a cellar of a partially bombed-out building in the wealthy Grunewald neighborhood in Berlin. During this time he wrote poems about love and the divine, and tributes to his artistic role models. In other poems, he turned to a new theme: they evoke nature as a place of refuge and a spiritual home. These poems give a glimpse into the artist's innermost feelings and can be understood as "unpainted paintings."
The war was almost over when on 25 April 1945 bombs destroyed most of the artwork that Ascher had left with friends.

Late work 
After Hitler's defeat, Ascher continued to live in Berlin Grunewald, with Martha Graßmann, who hid him 1942–1945, at Bismarckallee 26. Withdrawn from society, he threw himself into his work. Karl Ellwanger remembered, "When he worked, he seemed to be in a trance, he was almost not there. My presence did not disturb his work. He would walk the length of the room, adding a brushstroke and then walking back, a constant back and forth – it was impossible to follow him."
His studio was a large semi-circle room with adjoining winter garden. During the winter, when the studio could not be heated, Ascher created works on paper: ink drawings, watercolors and gouaches. 1952/53 he had a phase of most intense work. Again and again phases of tremendous creative productivity were interrupted by times of depression.

Initially he painted over some of his early work, but soon he focused mainly on landscapes, only sometimes drawing people from memory. Living close to the Grunewald, Berlin's expansive city forest, the artist observed and painted nature in different light, at different day-times and seasons, which he re-created in his studio. He painted powerful images of trees and meadows, sunrises and sunsets, all devoid of human presence, in which sun and light are a dominant force. With these paintings, Ascher continued the intense contact with nature begun in his poems.

Ascher worked with renewed immediacy and urgency, dramatically simplifying forms and medium. His thick, bright pigments suggest both vibrant, life-affirming joy and, in the rough-hewn nature of his brushstrokes, a dark, inner anguish transformed into light. The emotional narratives of his early work were replaced by economical landscape images and stylized flowers and trees, single-mindedly repeated at an intimate scale. Near-obsession combined with close observation and an appreciation of nuance. Especially the trees, singly or in rows, in groups of two or three, became standing figures that confront us, each as unmistakable as each individual.

Fritz Ascher died on 26 March 1970.

Legacy 
During his lifetime, Ascher enjoyed only one large retrospective exhibition, which opened at Berlin's Rudolf Springer Gallery in 1969, a few months before his death. Since 2016, exhibitions and publications are introducing the artist to the public. On 21 February 2018 a Stolperstein (stumbling block) for Fritz Ascher was placed at Niklasstrasse 21–23 in Berlin-Zehlendorf.

Exhibitions 
Fritz Ascher was a member of the Berufsverband Bildender Künstler Berlins (1946–1970).

 2022 – "Identity, Art and Migration. Seven Artists persecuted by German Nazis 1933-1945". Curators: Dr. Ori Z Soltes and Rachel Stern. Online exhibition https://migration.fritzaschersociety.org, 27 February 2022 – 27 February 2027 
 2021 – "Fritz Ascher: Themes and Variations. A Digital Exhibition Experience." Curator Elizabeth Berkowitz. Online exhibition https://fritzaschersociety.org/exhibition-event/fritz-ascher-themes-and-variations-a-digifas-digital-exhibition-experience/, 30 September 2021 – 30 September 2024 
 2020 – "Der Vereinsamte. Propheten und Clowns in der Kunst Fritz Aschers (1893–1970)." / "The Loner. Prophets and Clowns in Fritz Ascher’s Art (1893–1970)". Forum Jacob Pins, Höxter, 6 September – 29 November
 2020 – "Fritz Ascher, Expressionist." Joel and Lila Harnett Museum of Art, University of Richmond, Richmond (VA), 16 January – 24 May
 2019 – "Im Reich der Nummern. Wo die Männer keine Namen haben./In the Country of Numbers. Where the Men have no Names". Gedenkstätte und Museum Sachsenhausen, Sachsenhausen, 29 January – 31 July
 2019 – "Fritz Ascher, Expressionist." Grey Art Gallery, New York University, New York, 9 January – 6 April
 2018–19 – "Umkämpfte Wege der Moderne. Wilhelm Schmid und die Novembergruppe." Potsdam Museum – Forum für Kunst und Geschichte, Potsdam, 29 September 2018 – 27 January 2019
 2017–18 – "Sechs Wochen sind fast wie lebenslänglich..." Das Potsdamer Polizeigefängnis Priesterstrasse/Bauhofstrasse / "Six weeks is almost like a life sentence..." The Potsdam police prison in Priesterstrasse/Bauhofstrasse. Stiftung Gedenkstätte Lindenstrasse, Potsdam, 12 December 2017 – 29 April 2018
 2017 – "Beauteous Strivings: Fritz Ascher, Works on Paper." Curated by Karen Wilkin. New York Studio School, New York, 26 October – 3 December 2017
 2017 – "Hauptstadtfussball". Stadtmuseum Berlin – Ephraim Palais, Berlin, 26 July 2017 – 7 January 2018
 2016–18 – "Leben ist Glühn. Der Expressionist Fritz Ascher"/"To Live is to Glow with Passion. The Expressionist Fritz Ascher". Felix-Nussbaum-Haus, Osnabrück, 25 September 2016 – 15 January 2017; Kunstsammlungen Chemnitz – MUSEUM GUNZENHAUSER, Chemnitz, 4 March – 18 June 2017; Museum Charlottenburg-Wilmersdorf in der Villa Oppenheim, Berlin, 8 December 2017 – 11 March 2018; Potsdam Museum – Forum für Kunst und Geschichte, Potsdam, 10 December 2017 – 11 March 2018; Museum Schlösschen im Hofgarten, Wertheim, 13 May – 10 September 2018; Kallmann-Museum-Museum, Ismaning, 30 September – 25 November 2018
 2016/17 – "Golem – Die Legende vom Menschen", Jüdisches Museum, Berlin, 23 September 2016 – 29 January 2017
 2015–16 – "Verfahren. "Wiedergutmachung" im geteilten Berlin" ("Making Amends" Compensation and Restitution Cases in Divided Berlin), Aktives Museum, Berlin, 9 October 2015 – 14 January 2016; Landgericht Berlin/Amtsgericht Mitte, Berlin, 29 September – 18 November 2016
 2014 – "Zeitenwende 1914. Fritz Ascher und Gert Heinrich Wollheim." Galerie d'Hamé, Mülheim/Ruhr, 28 November –
 2013 – "Diversity Destroyed. Berlin 1933-1938-1945. A City Remembers" (Zerstörte Vielfalt. Berlin 1933-1938-1945. Eine Stadt erinnert sich) Kulturprojekte Berlin, information pillar Frankfurter Tor, Berlin 31 January – 10 November
 1996 – Synagogue for the Arts, New York, 14 March – 12 April
 1993 – International Monetary Fund Art Forum, Washington, DC, 30 March – 21 May
 1980 – Schwarzbach Gallery, Sindelfingen, October
 1980 – Kreissparkasse Böblingen, 21 March – 25 April
 1979 – Ute Freckmann Gallery, Sindelfingen, 21–28 July
 1969 – Fritz Ascher: Bilder nach 1945, Galerie Springer, Berlin, Berlin
 1947 – Das Naturerlebnis. Landschaftsbilder bekannter Künstler, Kunstamt Wilmersdorf, Berlin
 1946 – "Fritz Ascher: Bilder nach 1945," with Bernhard Heiliger, Karl Buchholz Gallery, Berlin
 1924 – Juryfreie Kunstschau, Berlin
 1922 – Juryfreie Kunstschau, Berlin

See also
 List of German painters

Notes

References 
Website of the Fritz Ascher Society, New York
 Bendt, Vera. "Der Golem." Unpublished manuscript. Berlin 1993.
 Bilski, Emily and Martina Lüdicke (Eds.). Golem. Exhibition catalogue. Jüdisches Museum Berlin 2016. Bielefeld/Berlin: Kerber 2016. 133.
 "Das Naturerlebnis. Landschaftsbilder bekannter Künstler." In Der Morgen. Tageszeitung der Liberal-Demokratischen Partei Deutschlands. Berlin 240 (14 October 1947). 3.
 Budick, Arielle. "Sustained by art through the darkness. Fritz Ascher’s work, now on show in New York, reflects his reclusive, obsessive nature and his turbulent life." In Financial Times, 23 January 209. 6.
 Dupuis-Panther, Ferdinand "'Leben ist Glühn' – Der Expressionist Fritz Ascher (1893–1970)." In schwarzaufweiss. Das Reisemagazin, November 2016.
 Ellerbrock, Wolfgang. "Familie Ascher und die Niklasstrasse 21/23." In Jahrbuch 2019. Zehlendorf. Altes und Neues von Menschen, Landschaften und Bauwerken. Heimatverein Zehlendorf Museum und Archiv Berlin 2018. 73–77.
 Freudenheim, Tom L. "Finally Home with the Greats. An exhibition places the under-the-radar Fritz Ascher squarely in the canon of 20th-century German artists." In Wall Street Journal, 9 January 2019. A13.
 "Fritz Ascher." In Dresslers Kunsthandbuch. Berlin 1930. Vol. 2. 24.
 "Fritz Ascher." In Handbuch des Kunstmarktes. Kunstadressbuch für das Deutsche Reich. Danzig und Deutsch-Österreich. Berlin 1926. 283.
 Götzmann, Jutta and Sabine Witt, "Leben ist Glühn. Der deutsche Expressionist Fritz Ascher. 10. Dezember 2017 bis 11. März 2018." In MuseumsJournal Berlin & Potsdam 1 (January – March 2018). 22–24.
 Hölzer, Wiebke. "Der Golem freut sich über seinen Riesenerfolg. Paul Wegeners und Henrik Galeens Film 'Der Golem' von 1914". In Berlin in Geschichte und Gegenwart. Jahrbuch des Landesarchivs Berlin 2017. Ed. Werner Breunig and Uwe Schaper. Berlin: Gebr. Mann Verlag 2017. 111–133.
 Hölzer, Wiebke. "Film, Fussball, Flanieren. Die Rolle Berlins im Oeuvre des Malers Fritz Ascher." In Expressionismus 8 (2018). Ed. Kristin Eichhorn and Johannes S. Lorenzen. Berlin: Neofelis Verlag 2018. 74–89.
 Hölzer, Wiebke. "Kunststück." In Weltkunst, No. 129, May 2017. 120–121.
 Hölzer, Wiebke. Fritz Ascher. In Biographisch-Bibliografisches Kirchenlexikon (BBKL), vol. 38. Nordhausen: Verlag Traugott Bautz GmbH 2017. 66–71.
 Hölzer, Wiebke. Religiös? Kontextualisierung der Gemälde 'Golgatha' (1915) und 'Der Golem' (1916 des Künstlers Fritz Ascher (1893–1970) / Religious? Contextualization of the paintings "Golgotha" (1915) and "The Golem" (1916) by the artist Fritz Ascher (1893–1970). MA Thesis Humboldt-Universität zu Berlin. Berlin 2016.
 Homann, Iris and Uta Gerlant (Ed.). "Sechs Wochen sind fast wie lebenslänglich…" Das Potsdamer Polizeigefängnis Priesterstrasse/Bauhofstrasse." Exhibition catalogue. Potsdam, Stiftung Gedenkstätte Lindenstrasse (2017). Potsdam 2018. 4,56–59.
 M.H. "Fritz Ascher" in Allgemeines Künstlerlexikon, vol. 5, München/Leipzig: K.G. Saur 1992. 385.
 Schoenemann, Heide. "Paul Wegener. Frühe Moderne im Film." Stuttgart and London 2003.  101 (no. 232 "Der Golem"), 136, 142.
 Soltes, Ori Z. Tradition and Transformation. Three Millennia of Jewish Arts and Architecture, Boulder, CO: Canal Street Studios 2016. 165,302–303.
 Stern, Rachel and Ori Z. Soltes, Eds. To Live is to Blaze with Passion: The Expressionist Fritz Ascher/ Leben ist Glühn: Der Expressionist Fritz Ascher. With contributions by Jörn Barfod, Eckhart Gillen, Wiebke Hölzer, Ingrid Mössinger, Ori Z. Soltes and Rachel Stern. Exhibition catalogue. Osnabrück, Felix Nussbaum-Haus (2016); Chemnitz, Kunstsammlungen Chemnitz – Museum Gunzenhauser (2017); Berlin, Museum Charlottenburg-Wilmersdorf (2017/18), Potsdam, Potsdam Museum (2017/18); Ismaning, Kallmann-Museum (2018). Cologne: Wienand 2016.
 Stern, Rachel. "Fritz Ascher. Unterbrechung künstlerischen Schaffens", in: Verfahren. "Wiedergutmachung" im geteilten Berlin. Aktives Museum Faschismus und Widerstand in Berlin e.V. in cooperation with Gedenkstätte Deutscher Widerstand. Exhibition catalogue. Berlin, Aktives Museum. Berlin: Lukas Verlag 2015. 48–53.
 van Dülmen, Moritz, Wolf Kühnelt und Bjoern Weigel (Eds.). Zerstörte Vielfalt. Berlin 1933-1938-1945. Eine Stadt erinnert sich. / Diversity Destroyed. Berlin 1933-1938-1945. A City Remembers. Exhibition catalogue. Berlin: Kulturprojekte Berlin 2013. 271.
 Wilkin, Karen. Beauteous Strivings: Fritz Ascher, Works on Paper. Introduction Rachel Stern. Exhibition catalogue. New York, New York Studio School. New York 2017.

External links 
 Website of the Fritz Ascher Society
 Biography of Fritz Ascher
 Stolpersteine in Berlin
 Yad Vashem The Righteous Among The Nations

1893 births
1970 deaths
Artists from Berlin
20th-century German painters
20th-century German male artists
German male painters
Expressionist painters
People from Charlottenburg-Wilmersdorf